David Irvine (November 26, 1835 – May 28, 1924) was an Irish-born farmer and political figure in New Brunswick, Canada. He represented Carleton in the House of Commons of Canada from 1881 to 1887 as a Liberal member.

He was born in Crimland, County Fermanagh, the son of Robert Irvine and Mary Ellis. He operated a farm near Centreville, New Brunswick. Irvine was elected in an 1881 by-election held after the death of George Heber Connell. He died in Centreville at the age of 92.

Electoral record

References 

1835 births
1924 deaths
Members of the House of Commons of Canada from New Brunswick
Liberal Party of Canada MPs